Farewell Oak Street is a Canadian docudrama short film, directed by Grant McLean and released in 1953. Narrated by Lorne Greene as part of the Canada Carries On series, the film centres on Toronto's late-1940s demolition of the run-down Oak Street neighbourhood in Cabbagetown in favour of the new Regent Park housing development, through a mixture of documentary footage of the reconstruction with a dramatization of the story of a family whose lives are transformed for the better by the project. The cast of the dramatic segments includes Roxanna Bond, Bonnie Brooks, Gerald Campbell, Eric Clavering, Andy Halmay, Cosie Lee, Edgar Marshall, Douglas Masters, Jim McRae and Kate Reid.

The film was controversial with residents of the Oak Street/Regent Park area, several of whom filed complaints objecting to being characterized as slum dwellers, and alleged that the film vastly overstated the dangers of life in the old neighbourhood prior to the redevelopment. Charles Henry, the area's Member of Parliament, spoke against the film in the Canadian House of Commons, calling it offensive to the dignity of the residents and demanding that citizenship minister Walter Edward Harris restrict the film's distribution. Harris declined to restrict the film. More recently, the film received some renewed attention in the early 2010s when Regent Park was again redeveloped, as the continued social problems in the community were contrasted against the film's overly optimistic thesis that the original post-war redevelopment was certain to solve them.

The film won the Canadian Film Award for Best Theatrical Short Film at the 6th Canadian Film Awards in 1954.

References

External links
 
 Watch Farewell Oak Street at the National Film Board of Canada

1953 films
Canadian short documentary films
Best Theatrical Short Film Genie and Canadian Screen Award winners
National Film Board of Canada short films
1953 short films
Canadian black-and-white films
1953 documentary films
Regent Park
Documentary films about poverty in Canada
1950s English-language films
Film controversies in Canada
1950s Canadian films